H13, H-13 or H.13 may refer to:

Roads
 H-13 (Michigan county highway), a road in the United States
 Highway H13 (Ukraine)

Vehicles
 Bell H-13 Sioux, an American helicopter
 , a H-class submarine ordered by but not commissioned into the Royal Navy
 Lioré et Olivier LeO H-13, a French flying boat
 LSWR H13 class, a British steam railcar

Other uses
 DIN 1.2344 tool steel, a tool steel grade
 London Buses route H13, a public transportation route in England
 A class of high-efficiency particulate air filter